The Samoa women's national football team represents Samoa in international women's football. The team is controlled by the Football Federation Samoa.

History
The team contested the 2019 Pacific Games in Apia, winning silver.

The team topped Group A in the 2022 OFC Women's Nations Cup after defeating both Tonga and the Cook Islands.

Current technical staff

Results and fixtures

The following is a list of match results in the last 12 months, as well as any future matches that have been scheduled.

Legend

2022

Players
A player is eligible to represent Samoa if they have a Samoan parent or grandparent. In 2021 Samoa held trials in Auckland, New Zealand to identify players from the diaspora who could represent it. It also identified potential players in the United States and Europe. In 2022 the impact of the Covid-19 pandemic resulted in Samoa-based players being excluded in favour of diaspora players.

Current squad
The following players were called up for the 2022 OFC Women's Nations Cup from 13–30 July in Suva, Fiji.

Caps and goals updated as of 1 August 2022, after the match against .

Competitive record

OFC Women's Nations Cup

*Draws include knockout matches decided on penalty kicks.

Pacific Games

See also

Sport in Samoa
Football in Samoa
Women's football in Samoa
Samoa women's national under-20 football team
Samoa women's national under-17 football team
Samoa women's national futsal team
Samoa women's national under-18 futsal team
Samoa men's national football team

References

 
Oceanian women's national association football teams